Shapath Bharadwaj (born 2 January 2002) is an Indian sport shooter. He won the bronze medal at the ISSF World Championship in Jr. Men's Double Trap Category at the age of 16. He currently holds a Senior World Rank 18 & Asian Ranking 8 in Double Trap Shooting.

References

External links 
 Profile at International Shooting Sport Federation

Living people
2002 births
Indian male sport shooters
21st-century Indian people